Cornufer weberi, Weber's wrinkled ground frog, is a species of frog in the family Ceratobatrachidae.
It is found in Papua New Guinea and Solomon Islands.
Its natural habitats are subtropical or tropical moist lowland forests, plantations, rural gardens, urban areas, and heavily degraded former forest.

References

weberi
Amphibians of Papua New Guinea
Amphibians of the Solomon Islands
Taxa named by Karl Patterson Schmidt
Amphibians described in 1932
Taxonomy articles created by Polbot